Sonora Borinquen is a Uruguayan tropical music group. It was founded on 28 February 1964.

The orchestra was founded in Montevideo with influences of Caribbean music, tropical sound, playing music for dances.

There are ten members: three singers, three trumpets, bass guitar, keyboard, timbales and congas. They have released more than 50 albums, some shared with other bands and recorded in various media formats such as LPs, cassettes, CDs and video. Nine of their albums were awarded Gold Discs in Uruguay.

On 30 October 2012, the leader of the band, the musician, composer and singer Juan Carlos Goberna, was recognised as an "Illustrious Citizen of the City of Montevideo".

In 2013, they celebrated their fiftieth anniversary in music with a free concert at the Teatro de Verano Ramón Collazo.

Sonora Borinquen has toured the Americas, including Brazil, Argentina, Canada and US.

Discography
1964 Así es Borinquen
1973 Tiembla el firmamento
1971 Tuya
1974 Diez años 
1979 Aniversario
1979 El duelo
1968 Con toda el alma
1969 Así es Borinquen
1981 Mírame
1981 Continuados de boleros
1982 Los más grandes éxitos
1984 Camionero 
1984 Aniversario
1985 Camionero
1988 Original
1988 Dios los cría
1989 Bodas de plata
1989 La noche
1989 El camionero de oro
1987 Identidad
1987 Cometa blanca
1990 Ellos se juntan
1991 Chévere
Carlos 1° rey de ensalada
Una fiesta en el batey 
 Una fiesta en el batey 
 Goberna mix 1
 El desafio
 Ellos se juntan
 Dios los cría
 Amor sagrado
 Cometa Blanca
 Ellos se juntan
 Sin tabú
 Bodas de plata
 El bonchon
 Así es borinquen
 Con toda el alma
 Sonora Borinquen
2002 Borinquen en Nueva York
2011 Los campeones de la salsa
2017 Trayectoria

Members  
 Juan Carlos Goberna (vocals)
 Gonzalo Magariños
 Andrés Angelelli 
 Daniel Romero 
 Gabriel Santos 
 Héctor Serafín 
 Wilson Rodríguez 
 Eduardo Maidana
 Pablo Goberna (vocals)
 Carlos "Junior" Goberna, hijo. (vocals)

Past members
 Oscar Leis
 Roberto Boston 
 Esteban Osano
 Pablo Silva 
 Sebastián Natal
 Pedro Freire
 Richard Madruga
 Dardo Martínez
 Héctor Regalini
 Julio Rodríguez
 Walter Soba
 Rodolfo Morandi
 Jorge Barreiro
 José Misa
 Eliceo Giménez
 Carlos Pomposi
 Luis Dornell
 José Goberna

References

Musical groups established in 1964
Plena
Uruguayan music
Latin music groups